Bureta Faraimo (born 16 July 1990) is a United States international rugby league footballer who plays on the  for the Castleford Tigers in the Betfred Super League.

He has previously played for the Parramatta Eels and the New Zealand Warriors in the NRL, and Hull F.C. in the Super League.

Early life
Faraimo was born in Wellington, New Zealand, and is of Tokelaun descent (Olohega) also known as Swains Island which is apart of American Samoa.

He played his junior rugby league for St. George, New Zealand.

Club career

New Zealand
In 2010, Faraimo trialed with the New Zealand Warriors Under 20s team but didn't get a contract. Later that year, while playing for the Wainuiomata Lions, Faraimo was selected to play for the Wellington Orcas in the National Competition, scoring 12 tries in his first 3 games.

Mackay Cutters
In 2011, Faraimo moved to Australia to play for the Mackay Cutters in the Queensland Cup for more rugby league exposure. In just half a season, Faraimo had scored 29 tries.

Parramatta Eels
In November 2013, due to the exposure from the World Cup, Faraimo signed a two-year contract with National Rugby League team, the Parramatta Eels.

In round 21 of the 2014 NRL season, Faraimo made his NRL debut for Parramatta against the Cronulla-Sutherland Sharks. He scored two tries on debut in the club's 32–12 win at Remondis Stadium.

On 4 April 2015, Faraimo re-signed with Parramatta on a one-year contract.

On 3 May 2016, Faraimo played for the New South Wales Residents against the Queensland Residents.

On 2 May 2017, Faraimo played for the New South Wales Residents against the Queensland Residents for the second year in a row.

New Zealand Warriors
In July 2017, Faraimo joined the New Zealand Warriors for the remainder of the season, after being released from his Eels contract. Although joining the Warriors for the remainder of 2017, he planned to join the Super League in 2018. On 28 August 2017, he was named on the wing in the 2017 Intrust Super Premiership NSW Team of the Year. He didn't play an NRL game for the Warriors.

Hull F.C.
In August 2017, he signed a two-year contract with Super League side Hull FC, starting in 2018.

He played 13 games for Hull F.C. in the 2020 Super League season including the club's semi-final defeat against Wigan as they got within one game of the grand final.

Castleford
In round 18 of the 2022 Super League season, Faraimo scored two tries in Castleford's 34-20 loss against Leeds at Magic Weekend.
In round 20 of the 2022 Super League season, Faraimo scored two tries for Castleford in a 46-18 victory over Hull F.C.
In round 22 of the 2022 Super League season, Faraimo scored a hat-trick in Castleford's 20-12 loss against St Helens.

Representative career
In 2009 and 2010, Faraimo played for the New Zealand Residents.

In 2011, Faraimo played for the Queensland Rangers team.

In 2013, Faraimo was selected in the United States 2013 Rugby League World Cup squad, qualifying because his father was born on Swains Island, an island administered by the United States as part of American Samoa.

Faraimo competed in the 2017 Rugby League World Cup for the United States, featuring in all three pool matches: losing 12–58 to Fiji, 0–46 to Italy and 0–64 to Papua New Guinea.

Faraimo returned to action for the United States two years later, playing in the 2019 Rugby League World Cup 9s before heading to Jacksonville, Florida for the nation's 2021 Rugby League World Cup qualifier match against Cook Islands.

References

External links

Hull FC profile
Parramatta Eels profile

2017 RLWC profile
SL profile

1990 births
Living people
Hull F.C. players
Mackay Cutters players
New Zealand people of Tokelauan descent
New Zealand people of American Samoan descent
New Zealand rugby league players
Expatriate sportspeople in England
Parramatta Eels players
Rugby league players from Wellington City
Rugby league wingers
United States national rugby league team players
Wainuiomata Lions players
Wellington rugby league team players
Wentworthville Magpies players